Thiago Silva (born 1984) is a Brazilian footballer.

Thiago Silva may also refer to:
 Thiago Silva (fighter) (born 1982), Brazilian kickboxer and mixed martial artist
 Thiago Silva (footballer, born 1983), Brazilian football player
 Thiago Jotta da Silva (1983–2008), Brazilian footballer
 Thiago Braz da Silva (born 1993), Brazilian pole vaulter
 Thiago Silva (weightlifter), Brazilian weightlifter

See also
 Tiago Silva (disambiguation)